Faiz Suhaimi (born 13 March 1992), is a Malaysian footballer who plays as a defender who can operate as fullback. He is also part of 2013 Kelantan President Cup Team that is the champion Malaysia President Cup after winning in the final against Perak President Cup Team 2–1.

Club career

Early career
Faiz Suhaimi began his football career playing for Kelantan President's Cup team in 2009. He was part of the team and managed to bring his team won the 2013 Presidents Cup.

Kelantan
2014 was his debut year as a senior player graduated from the President's Cup team

Honours

Club
Kelantan President Cup
 Malaysia President Cup: 2013
Melaka United
Malaysia FAM League(1): 2015

References

1992 births
Living people
Malaysian footballers
Kelantan FA players
People from Kelantan
Melaka United F.C. players
Association football defenders